The Kartudjara are an Aboriginal Australian people of the Pilbara region of Western Australia.

Country
Their western boundary lay on the southern side of the Rudall River (Karlamilyi) as far as the Robertson Range and the eastern headwaters of both the Jigalong and Savory Creeks. The country was characterized by endemic parallel sand-dune formations.

History
The Kartudjara thereafter went on to water at the Rudall River, which became in time their northern frontier. Their neighbours beyond the mulga were the spinifex plainsmen, the Wanman and the Nyangumarta.

The Kartudjara became, in recent times, one of the two core constituent tribal groups forming the Martu. That term actually signified 'northerners', but originally was used primarily to denote people who had undergone initiation rites to become fully-fledged tribesmen.

Some Kartudjara were received as 'lawmen' by the coastal peoples to their west in the post-war period, since they, like other desert tribes, had conserved the traditional ceremonial lore that had been lost to tribes on the Indian Ocean's coastal areas.

Alternative names
 Katudjara, Katatjara, Kardudjara.
 Gadudjara.
 Walmala.
 Orailku.
 Ngadari.('strangers'.)

Notes

Citations

Sources

Aboriginal peoples of Western Australia
Canning Stock Route
Mid West (Western Australia)